Kord Kola (also Romanized as Kord Kolā) is a village in Chapakrud Rural District, Gil Khuran District, Juybar County, Mazandaran Province, Iran. At the 2006 census, its population was 1,631, in 397 families.

See also 
 Modan (tribe)
 Kord Kheyl, Juybar

References 

Populated places in Juybar County